Giorgio Bàrberi Squarotti (14 September 1929 – 9 April 2017) was an Italian academic, literary critic and poet. He taught at the University of Turin from 1967 until his death in 2017. He was considered to be one of the most important literary critics of his time.

Biography
Giorgio Bàrberi Squarotti was born in 1929 in Turin. He received his PhD in Italian literature from the University of Turin in 1952–1953, with a thesis on Giordano Bruno. He taught Italian literature at the same University from 1967 until his death in 2017, and was a prominent literary critic. He was known for his detailed studies on classical Italian authors such as Dante, Petrarch, Machiavelli, Tasso, Manzoni, Verga and Gozzano, and was also interested in contemporary writers, including D'Annunzio and Svevo. He coordinated the Grande dizionario della lingua italiana, published by UTET, where he worked as editor. UTET also published his Storia della civiltà letteraria italiana in six parts (1990–1996).
He has been member of the Contemporary Centre of Arts and of the Empathic Movement (Empathism) founded by Menotti Lerro.

Publications

Critical work

Astrazione e realtà, Milano: Rusconi e Paolazzi (Quaderni de Il Verri), 1960
Poesia e narrativa del secondo Novecento, Milano: Mursia, 1961, 1967, 1971, 1978
Metodo, stile, storia, Milano: Fabbri, 1962
La poesia italiana contemporanea dal Carducci ai giorni nostri (con Stefano Jacomuzzi), Messina-Firenze: D'Anna, 1963, 1973, 1980
La narrativa italiana del dopoguerra, Bologna: Cappelli, 1965, 1968, 1975
Pagine di teatro, Torino: SEI, 1965
Teoria e prove dello stile del Manzoni, Milano: Silva, 1965
La cultura e la poesia italiana del dopo guerra, Bologna: Cappelli, 1966
La forma tragica del Principe e altri saggi sul Machiavelli, Firenze: Olschki, 1966
Simboli e strutture della poesia del Pascoli, Messina-Firenze: D'Anna, 1966, 1976
Camillo Sbarbaro, Milano: Mursia, 1971
Il gesto improbabile. Tre saggi su Gabriele D'Annunzio, Palermo: Flaccovio, 1971
L'artificio dell'eternità. Studi dantechi, Verona: Fiorini, 1972
Il codice di Babele, Milano: Rizzoli, 1972
Manzoni. Testimonianze di critica e di polemica (con Marziano Guglielminetti), Messina-Firenze: D'Anna, 1973
Gli inferi e il labirinto. Da Pascoli a Montale, Bologna: Cappelli, 1974
Poesia e ideologia borghese, Napoli: Liguori, 1976
Fine dell'idillio. Da Dante a Marino, Genova: Il melangolo, 1978
Le sorti del tragico. Il novecento italiano: romanzo e teatro, Ravenna: Longo, 1978
Il romanzo contro la storia. Studi sui Promessi sposi, Milano: Vita e pensiero, 1980
Dall'anima al sottosuolo. Problemi della letteratura dell'Ottocento da Leopardi a Lucini, Ravenna: Longo, 1982
Giovanni Verga. Le finzioni dietro il verismo, Palermo: Flaccovio, 1982
Invito alla lettura di Gabriele d'Annunzio, Milano: Mursia, 1982, 1988, 1993
Il potere della parola. Studi sul Decameron, Napoli: Federico & Ardia, 1983
La poesia del Novecento. Morte e trasfigurazione del soggetto, Caltanissetta: Sciascia, 1985
L'ombra di Argo. Studi sulla Commedia, Torino: Genesi, 1986, 1992
L'onore in corte. Dal Castiglione al Tasso, Milano: F. Angeli, 1986
La forma e la vita. Il romanzo del Novecento, Milano: Mursia, 1987
Machiavelli, o La scelta della letteratura, Roma: Bulzoni, 1987
Manzoni. Le delusioni della letteratura, Rovito: Marra, 1988
Il sogno della letteratura, Milano: F. Angeli, 1988
In nome di Beatrice e altre voci, Torino: Genesi, 1989
Invito alla lettura di Gabriele D'Annunzio, Mursia, 1990
La simbologia di Giovanni Pascoli, Mucchi, 1990
Le maschere dell'eroe. Dall'Alfieri a Pasolini, Lecce: Milella, 1990
Le colline, i maestri, gli dei, Treviso: Quaranta, 1992
La scrittura verso il nulla: D'Annunzio, Torino: Genesi, 1992
Tre sogni nella letteratura-Una stagione fiamminga con Giorgio, Porreca, G. Paolo, AGE-Alfredo Guida Editore, 1992
Il sogno e l'epica, Torino: Genesi, 1993
Il viaggio di liberazione attraverso l'Inferno, Torino: Genesi, 1993
Parodia e pensiero: Giordano Bruno, Milano: Greco & Greco, 1997
Le capricciose ambagi della letteratura, Torino: Tirrenia, 1998
Il vero Ettorre: l'eroe del "Giorno", Edizioni dell'Orso, 1999
Il terzo giorno, Pironti, 1999
La quarta triade con Giuliano Gramigna e Angelo Mundula, Spirali, 2000
Ludovico Ariosto-Torquato Tasso con Sergio Zatti, Editalia, 2000
L'orologio d'Italia. Carlo Levi e altri racconti, Ragusa: Libroitaliano, 2001
Le vane nevi, Bonaccorso, 2002
Corrado Alvaro. Atti del Convegno (Mappano Torinese) con Marziano Guglielminetti, Morace Aldo M., Falzea, 2002
Addio alla poesia del cuore, Sovera Multimedia, 2002
I miti e il sacro. Poesia del Novecento, Cosenza: Pellegrini, 2003
Il tragico cristiano da Dante ai moderni, Firenze: Olschki, 2003
La buona gara, Libroitaliano, 2003
Tre poeti. Vol.1, Zaccagnino, 2003 (con Amoretti Giangiacomo; Balbis Giannino)
Ottocento ribelle, Albano: Anemone Purpurea, 2005
La teoria e le interpretazioni, Napoli: Guida, 2005
Le cortesie e le audaci impresse. Moda, maghe e magie nei poemi cavallereschi, Lecce: Manni, 2006
La letteratura instabile. Il teatro e la novella fra Cinquecento ed età barocca, Treviso: Santi Quaranta, 2006
Il pipistrello a teatro. Pirandello, narrativa e tragedia, Verona: Bonaccorso, 2006
La farfalla, l'anima. Saggi su Gabriele d'Annunzio narratore, Verona: Bonaccorso, 2007
Il sistema della narrativa. Gli autori del Novecento: saggi critici, Montichiari: Zanetto, 2008
La poesia, il sacro e il patinoire. Saggi su Gozzano e Pavese, Sestri Levante: Gammarò, 2009
La cicala, la forbice e l'ubriaco. Montale, Sbarbaro e l'altra Liguria, Sestri Levante: Gammarò, 2011
Le donne al potere e altre interpretazioni. Boccaccio e Ariosto, Lecce: Manni, 2011
Entello, Ulisse, la matrona e la fanciulla. Saggi su Saba e Campana, Sestri Levante: Gammarò, 2011
Tutto l'Inferno. Lettura integrale della prima cantica del poema dantesco, Milano: F. Angeli, 2011
L'ultimo cuore del novecento. Paesaggi per la poesia, Sestri Levante: Gammarò, 2012

Creative work
 
La voce roca, Milano: All'insegna del pesce d'oro, 1960
La declamazione onesta, Milano: Rizzoli, 1965
Finzione e dolore, Pisa: Valenti, 1976
Notizie dalla vita, Livorno: Bastogi, 1977
Il marinaio del Mar Nero e altre poesie, Fossalta di Piave: Rebellato, 1980
Dalla bocca della balena, Torino: Genesi, 1986
In un altro regno, Torino: Genesi, 1990
La scena del mondo, Torino: Genesi, 1994
Dal fondo del tempio, Torino: Genesi, 1999
Le vane nevi, Verona: Bonaccorso, 2002
Il gioco e il verbo, Castelfrentano: Orient Express, 2005
La storia vera, Montichiari: Zanetto, 2006
I doni e la speranza, Albano: Anemone Purpurea, 2007
Gli affanni, gli agi e la speranza, Forlì: L'arcolaio, 2008
Le foglie di Sibilla, Genova: De Ferrari, 2008
Lo scriba delle stagioni, Castel di Judica: Samperi, 2008
Il giullare di Nôtre-Dame des Neiges, Roma: EdiLet, 2010

References

1929 births
2017 deaths
Barberi Squarotti, Giorgio
Italian poets
Academic staff of the University of Turin